Chandauli is a town and a nagar panchayat in Chandauli district in the state of  Uttar Pradesh, India. It is the administrative headquarters of Chandauli District.

Geography
It comes under Varanasi division of Uttar Pradesh. It is located about 30 kilometers from Varanasi. Mughalsarai, a major railway junction between Northern and Eastern India is located in Chandauli district. Chandauli Majhwar railway station serves Chandauli.

Notable people
 Baba Keenaram, Aghori ascetic believed to be the originator of the Aghori sect of Shaivism.
 Rajnath Singh, current Defense Minister of India and former Home Minister of India, born in Bhabhaura, a small village in Chandauli District.

Distance of Chandauli from important cities 
Varanasi – 30 km
Allahabad – 155 km
Gwalior – 623 km
Lucknow- 320 km
Kanpur – 350 km
Ghazipur – 50 km
Mirzapur – 80 km 
Jaunpur – 90 km
Azamgarh – 125 km
Gorakhpur – 210 km
Patna – 230 km 
Gaya – 230 km 
Ranchi – 400 km
Jharsuguda – 824 km
New Delhi – 810 km
Kolkata – 670 km
Madhupur Sonbhadra – 85 km
Parasi Kalan – 15 km

References